Albert Edward Dunn (13 February 1864 – 2 May 1937) was a radical British Liberal Party politician who served as Mayor of Exeter and as a Member of Parliament.

Background
He was the eldest son of William Henry Dunn JP of Exeter. He was educated at Hallam Hall College, Clevedon in Somerset. He was unmarried.

Professional career
In 1887 he was admitted as a solicitor. In 1892 he was a founding partner in the firm of Dunn & Baker, solicitors of Exeter. He later became a partner for Dunn, Baker & Co. of London. He retired from his legal work to concentrate on his political career. In 1914 on the outbreak of war, he received a commission with the Sportsman's Battalion of the Royal Fusiliers and was responsible for recruiting a company of soldiers from Exeter and the West Country.

Political career
His first venture into politics had been standing as a candidate for election to Exeter City Council, to which he was first elected in 1888. He first stood for election to Parliament at the 1892 general election, when he was unsuccessful in the Conservative-held Exeter constituency. He did not contest the General Elections of 1895 and 1900. Like his father, he served as a Justice of the peace in Exeter. He remained active in local politics in Exeter and served twice as Mayor of Exeter, in 1900-01 and in 1901-02. In 1905 he served as Honorary Town clerk of Exeter. He returned to parliamentary politics for the 1906 general election, when he was elected as Member of Parliament (MP) for the Cornish mining constituency of Camborne. He had held the seat for the Liberal Party with an increased majority despite the presence of a socialist candidate;

He was re-elected in January 1910, again increasing his majority despite the Liberal Party losing ground across the country;

He decided not to defend his seat at the December 1910 general election. He stood again at the December 1918 general electionbut this time in the neighbouring constituency of St Ives and not as  Liberal, but as a candidate for the Labour Party. His Liberal opponent was supported by the Coalition Government and won;

He did not contest the 1922 General Election but did contest St Ives again at the 1923 General Election where he finished third;

References

External links 
 

1864 births
1937 deaths
Liberal Party (UK) MPs for English constituencies
UK MPs 1906–1910
UK MPs 1910
Members of the Parliament of the United Kingdom for Camborne
Labour Party (UK) parliamentary candidates
English justices of the peace
Mayors of Exeter
English solicitors
Royal Fusiliers officers